Lewis is an unincorporated community in central Granville County, North Carolina, United States, north of Oxford.

Elmwood was listed on the National Register of Historic Places in 1988.

References

Unincorporated communities in North Carolina
Unincorporated communities in Granville County, North Carolina